web2project is a web-based, multi-user, multi-language Project Management application.  It is an open-source software and free for any uses and is maintained by an open community of volunteer programmers.  web2project, as collaborative software, allows for real-time interaction between task assignees and updates for participants.

Structures and Features
Basic data elements and management functions include:
 Projects and Tasks
 Contact Manager with vCard support
 Resource / Asset Manager
 Gantt charts, Export via PDF or simple JPEG images
 Calendar with user-based time zones, Syndication via iCalendar (supports Outlook, Thunderbird, Google Calendar, etc.)
 Reporting
 Project file manager
 Related Weblinks Manager
 Access control via ACL including respect for private events, tasks, and contacts
 Audit Log of all activities by all users
 Translation System supporting Czech, German, English, Spanish, Farsi, French, Italian, Polish, Portuguese, Brazilian Portuguese, and Russian

History
web2project started as a fork of dotProject in late 2007.

Since the entire original team membership consisted of former dotProject contributors, the design and development decisions were quite similar to dotProject itself. As time went on, the systems diverged though web2project has maintained a "converter" which allows dotProject users to perform a one-way conversion to web2project. At present, the web2project community suffers from fewer add-on modules and a smaller community in general.

As of July 2010, web2project is available via RPM install for Mandriva Linux.

Support and Community
The primary means of day to day support is provided free by volunteers in both the forums and via online documentation.

See also

 List of project management software
 Project management

References

External links
Official Website
SourceForge Profile
Legal Operations Software
Field Service Management Software

Free project management software
PHP software